The 2015 British Rowing Senior Championships were the 44th edition of the National Senior Championships, held from 17–18 October 2015 at the National Water Sports Centre in Holme Pierrepont, Nottingham. They were organised and sanctioned by British Rowing, and are open to British rowers.

Medal summary

References

British Rowing Senior Championships
British Rowing Senior Championships
British Rowing Senior Championships